The following are a list of highways designated in the numeric 1000-1499 range.

The roads listed below are all in the United States, primarily Louisiana, Texas, and Kentucky, though there are some roads in this range in Georgia and New Mexico.

The road numbering scheme in Great Britain includes roads with four digit designations, but all are prefaced by either A or B depending on whether the road is a trunk road or a distributor road, respectively. Due to this numbering scheme and their classification, they are not included on this page.

Abbreviation Notes
In Texas, the four-digit roads are given the designation farm-to-market road (FM) or ranch-to-market (RM). In Georgia, the highways hold the abbreviation SR for State Route.

1000-1099

1100-1199

1200-1299

1300-1399

1400-1499

See also
Four-digit A roads in Great Britain
Four-digit B roads in Great Britain